Open Space Institute (OSI) (not to be confused with the facilitator network of open conversation space) is a conservation organization that seeks to preserve scenic, natural and historic landscapes for public enjoyment, conserve habitats while sustaining community character, and help protect the environment. OSI uses policy initiatives and ground-level activism to help accomplish its goals.

Background
The Open Space Institute, established in 1964, achieves its goals through land acquisition, conservation easements, regional loan programs, creative partnerships, fiscal sponsorship, and analytical research. It seeks to do this through land acquisition, establishing conservation easements and through creative partnerships with other organizations.  It is active across the country, including the states of New York, Vermont, New Hampshire, Maine, Georgia, South Carolina, Virginia, Tennessee, and New Jersey.

Activities
OSI's New York Land Protection Program purchases land and easements in New York State, OSI's home and historic base of operations, where it has protected  of land. OSI focuses on protecting scenic, historic, recreational and agricultural landscapes in the greater Hudson River Valley region, from the Palisades to the Adirondacks High Peaks. Working with state and local governments, land trusts of all sizes, and individual landowners, OSI has created and expanded more than 40 parks and preserves, protected family farms, helped develop appropriate land use policies, and increased public funding for conservation.

Through the Conservation Finance Program, OSI seeks to accelerate the rate and effectiveness of conservation by providing grants and low-cost bridge loans for land transactions in selected landscapes in the eastern United States. The program works primarily with small to mid-sized land trusts to protect diverse landscapes that include parks and preserves as well as working farms and forests.  Currently the CFP is focused on the Northern Forest, the Hudson River Valley of New York State, New Jersey, western Massachusetts, and the Southern Appalachians. Since its inception in 2000, the CFP has made 51 loans and grants totaling more than $41 million, protecting .

The Conservation Institute, launched in 2006, produces and distributes information addressing pressing land conservation issues, conducting original research as well as synthesizing studies by other groups. The Conservation Institute also serves as OSI's internal research and development center, guiding strategic planning in its land acquisition and loan programs. Externally, the Conservation Institute informs conservation practitioners and the general public, and shapes public policies at the state, county and local levels.

See also
	

 Conservation movement
 Environmental protection
 Glynwood Center
 Habitat conservation
 List of environmental organizations
 New York - New Jersey Trail Conference

External links
 Open Space Institute

Environmental organizations based in the United States
Environmental organizations based in New York City